The barred dove (Geopelia maugeus) is a small dove that is native and endemic to the Lesser Sunda Islands in Indonesia. It is closely related to the zebra dove of southeast Asia and the peaceful dove of Australia and New Guinea.

It inhabits scrub, cultivated land and woodland edges in lowland areas. The barred dove is found on  Sumbawa, Flores, Sumba, Timor, the Tanimbar Islands, the Kei Islands, and other smaller islands.

The barred dove is similar to the zebra dove in appearance but has bare yellow skin around the eye and black-and-white barring which extends right across the breast and belly.

References 

 Morten Strange (2001). A Photographic Guide to the Birds of Indonesia. Christopher Helm, London,

External links 
 Species Factsheet from Birdlife International
 ITIS report for Geopelia maugei

barred dove
Birds of the Lesser Sunda Islands
barred dove
Taxa named by Coenraad Jacob Temminck